Per Lillo-Stenberg (21 June 1928 – 27 March 2014) was a Norwegian actor. His best known roles are in the movies Olsenbanden gir seg aldri! (1981) and Olsenbandens siste stikk (1999). He was born in Oslo. He and his wife Mette Lange-Nielsen  had a son, Lars Lillo-Stenberg, a musician for deLillos.

Lillo-Stenberg died after a short illness on 27 March 2014 in Levanger. He was 85.

Filmography 
 1949: Aldri mer! (Short film)
 1956: Gylne ungdom
 1956: Kvinnens plass
 1957: Peter van Heeren
 1958: De dødes tjern
 1959: Støv på hjernen
 1961: The Passionate Demons (Line)
 1961: Hans Nielsen Hauge
 1963: Læraren
 1964: Alle tiders kupp
 1966: Hurra for Andersens
 1966: Broder Gabrielsen
 1972: Skuggen av ein helt
 1976: Farlig yrke
 1981: Olsenbanden gir seg aldri!
 1999: Olsenbandens siste stikk
 2002: Regjeringen Martin
 2004: Salto, salmiakk og kaffe

References

External links
 

1928 births
2014 deaths
Norwegian male film actors
Norwegian male stage actors
Norwegian male television actors
Male actors from Oslo